ʿAbbās (also Abbass) is an old Arabic name that means "Lion". The name traces back to Al-‘Abbas ibn ‘Abd al-Muttalib in 536 CE (an uncle of Muhammad) and Abbas ibn Ali, a son of Ali ibn Abi Talib, who participated in the battle of Karbala alongside his brother Husayn ibn Ali. Abbas ibn Ali is revered by Muslims, some of whom are named Abbas in remembrance and tribute to him. There is an Arabian tribe of the same name, the Banu Abbas.

Notable people with the name include:

Historical figures
 Abbas ibn Abd al-Muttalib (565-653), uncle of Muhammad and forefather of the Abbasids
 Abbas ibn Ali (647–680), son of Ali ibn Abi Talib, died at the Battle of Karbala in an attempt to bring water for the thirsty children of his brother Husayn.
 Abbas ibn al-Walid (died 750), Umayyad prince and general
 Abbas ibn al-Ma'mun (died 838), Abbasid prince and general
 Abbas ibn Firnas (810–887), Berber physician, inventor, and musician
 Abbas ibn Abi al-Futuh (before 1115–1154), Fatimid vizier
 Abbas I of Persia (1557–1628), shah of Persia, known as King Abbas the Great
 Abbas II of Persia (1632–1666), shah of Persia 1642–1666
 Abbas III (died 1739?), shah of Persia 1732–1736
 Abbas Mirza (1783–1833), leader of the Persian armies in the wars with Russia 1811–13 and 1826–28.
 Abbas I of Egypt (1813–1854), known as Abbas Pasha, Wāli of Egypt 1848–1854
 Abbás Effendí (`Abdu'l–Bahá) (1844–1921), 2nd head of the Bahá'í Faith
 Abbas II of Egypt (1874–1944), known as Abbas Hilmi, Khedive of Egypt 1892–1914

Modern era
 Abbas Ali (disambiguation), several people
 Abbas Adham (1885–1969), Iranian physician and politician
 Abbas Aram (1906–1985), Iranian diplomat and politician
 Abbas Attar (1944–2018), Iranian photographer, member of Magnum Photos
 Abbas Karimi (born 1997), Afghan swimmer
 Abbas Khalili, also known as Abbas al-Khalili (1896–1972), Iraqi-born Iranian diplomat, newspaper publisher
 Abbas Kiarostami (born 1940–2016), Iranian film director
 Abbas Kazmi (born 1955), Indian criminal lawyer
 Abbas Dhilawala (born 1979) Indian born American software programmer

Middle name 
 Amir-Abbas Hoveyda (1919–1979), Iranian economist and politician
 Imran Abbas Naqvi, Pakistani actor, singer and producer
 Mukhtar Abbas Naqvi, Indian politician and government minister

Surname 
 Abu Abbas (1948–2004), known also as "Muhammad Zaidan", founder of the Palestine Liberation Front (PLF) organization
 Ackbar Abbas, Hong Kong born professor of comparative literature at the University of California, Irvine
 Ali Asad Abbas (born 1976), United Arab Emirates cricketer
 Ali Ismail Abbas (born 1991), Iraqi juvenile double amputee, a casualty of the United States invasion of Iraq in 2003
 Athar Abbas, Pakistani army general
 Bassim Abbas (born 1982), Iraqi footballer
 Bonfoh Abbass (1948–2021), former interim president of Togo
 Ferhat Abbas (1899–1985), political leader and first (provisional) President of Algeria
 Ghulam Abbas (writer) (1909–1982), Pakistani writer
 Ghulam Abbas (cricketer) (born 1947), Pakistani cricketer
 Hadiya Khalaf Abbas (1958–2021), Syrian politician
 Hiam Abbass (born 1960), Palestinian actress
 Hisham Abbas (born 1963), Egyptian musician
 Imad Abbas (1974?–2004), Palestinian militant
 Imran Abbas (born 1978), Pakistani cricketer
 Jesus Barabbas (son of Abbas), Jewish rebel leader
 Khodayyir Abbas, Iraq government official
 Khwaja Ahmad Abbas (1914–1987), an Indian film director, novelist, screenwriter, and a journalist.
 Mahmoud Abbas (born 1935) aka "Abu Mazen", President of the Palestinian National Authority (PNA) January 2005 – January 2009, office disputed since January 2009
 Mansour Abbas (born 1974), Israeli Arab politician
 Muhammad Abbas, multiple people
 Nadeem Abbasi, Pakistani cricketer
 Nabeel Abbas (born 1986), Iraqi footballer
 Nader Sufyan Abbas (born 1975), Bulgarian-Qatari weightlifter
 Nighat Abbass, Indian politician and social activist
 Qaiser Abbas (born 1982), Pakistani cricketer
 Roshan Abbas, Indian television and radio host
 Rushan Abbas, Uyghur American activist
 Sam Abbas (born 1993), Egyptian film producer and director
 Sohail Abbas (born 1977), Pakistani field hockey player
 Suleiman Al Abbas, Syrian engineer and politician
 Wael Abbas (born 1974), Egyptian human rights activist
 Yunis Khatayer Abbas, Iraqi journalist
 Yusef Abbas, Uyghur detainee at Guantanamo Bay
 Zaheer Abbas (born 1947), Pakistani cricketer

References

 
 
 

Arabic masculine given names
Arabic-language surnames
Iranian masculine given names
Pakistani masculine given names